Samson Harutyunyan was an Armenian politician who served as Minister of Justice of the First Republic of Armenia from 1918 to 1919.

In a letter to his wife, the first prime minister of Armenia, Hovhannes Kajaznuni, described Harutyunyan as having "been in public life for many years", adding: "he has been in public life for many years, he has experience and energy, but he is poor both in mind and spirit, he is a small person who can successfully manage small affairs, but the state scale is beyond him. of abilities. On top of all that, there is cunning and intrigue."

References 

People of the First Republic of Armenia
Armenian Ministers of Justice